Newton Grange may refer to:

 Newton Grange, Derbyshire, a civil parish in Derbyshire
 Newton Grange, Skipton, a listed building in Yorkshire

See also
 Newtongrange, a village in Midlothian